Dvortsy is the name of several rural localities in Russia:
Dvortsy, Kaluga Oblast, a selo in Dzerzhinsky District of Kaluga Oblast
Dvortsy, Kurgan Oblast, a village in Shatrovsky Selsoviet of Shatrovsky District of Kurgan Oblast
Dvortsy, Bezhanitsky District, Pskov Oblast, a village in Bezhanitsky District, Pskov Oblast
Dvortsy, Pskovsky District, Pskov Oblast, a village in Pskovsky District, Pskov Oblast
Dvortsy, Tver Oblast, a village in Staritsky District of Tver Oblast